Saxotic Stomp is an album by saxophonist Ricky Ford which was recorded in 1987 and released on the Muse label.

Reception

The AllMusic review by Scott Yanow stated "This is one of tenor saxophonist Ricky Ford's finer Muse recordings, although all nine are recommended. ... Ford's arrangements, while giving everyone adequate solo space, keep the proceedings moving. Well worth several listens".

Track listing
All compositions by Ricky Ford except where noted
 "Saxotic Stomp" – 3:21
 "Major Love" – 6:28
 "Art Steps" – 6:09
 "For Mary Lou" – 5:26
 "Ben's Den" – 7:28
 "Long Shadows" – 9:02
 "Ba-Lue Bolivar Ba-Lues-Are" (Thelonious Monk) – 5:53

Personnel
Ricky Ford - tenor saxophone, arranger
James Spaulding – alto saxophone, flute
Charles Davis – baritone saxophone
Kirk Lightsey – piano 
Ray Drummond – bass 
Jimmy Cobb – drums

References

Muse Records albums
Ricky Ford albums
1988 albums
Albums recorded at Van Gelder Studio